The 2021 Dudley Metropolitan Borough Council election took place on 6 May 2021 to elect members of Dudley Metropolitan Borough Council in England. This was on the same day as other local elections. One-third of the seats were up for election, with two wards (Belle Vale and Kingswinford North & Wall Heath) electing two councillors.

Results

Ward results

Amblecote

Belle Vale

Brierley Hill

Brockmoor and Pensnett

Castle and Priory

Coseley East

Cradley and Wollescote

Gornal

Halesowen North

Halesowen South

Hayley Green and Cradley South

Kingswinford North and Wall Heath

Kingswinford South

Lye and Stourbridge North

Netherton Woodside and St Andrew's

Norton

Pedmore and Stourbridge East

Quarry Bank and Dudley Wood

Sedgley

St James's

St Thomas's

Upper Gornal and Woodsetton

Wollaston and Stourbridge Town

Wordsley

References 

Dudley
Dudley Council elections